The Yi Sang Literary Award (이상문학상) is a South Korean literary award. It is one of South Korea's most prestigious literary awards, named after Yi Sang, an innovative writer in modern Korean literature. The Yi Sang Literary Award was established in 1977. It is sponsored by the Korean publisher Munhaksasangsa and has become one of the most prestigious literary awards in South Korea.

Winners

1977 김승옥 Kim Seung-ok,	〈서울의 달빛 0장〉 The Moonlight of Seoul
1978 이청준 Yi Chong-Jun	〈잔인한 도시〉 The Cruel City
1979 오정희 Oh Jung-hee	〈저녁의 게임〉 Evening Game
1980 유재용 Yoo Jae-yong	〈관계〉 Relationship
1981 박완서 Park Wan-suh,	〈엄마의 말뚝〉 Mother’s Hitching Post
1982 최인호 Choi In-ho,	〈깊고 푸른 밤〉 Deep Blue Night
1983 서영은 So Yeong-eun,	〈먼 그대〉 Distant You
1984 이균영 Lee Kyun-young,	〈어두운 기억의 저편〉 The Other Side of Dark Remembrance
1985 이제하 Yi Jae-ha,	〈나그네는 길에서도 쉬지 않는다〉 Travelers do not rest even on the road 
1986 최일남 Choi Il-nam,	〈흐르는 북〉 Flowing North
1987 이문열 Yi Mun-yol,	〈우리들의 일그러진 영웅〉 Our Twisted Hero
1988 임철우 Im Chul-woo,	〈붉은 방〉 The Red Room (co-winner)
1988 한승원 Han Seung-won,	〈해변의 길손〉 Beach Traveler (co-winner)
1989 김채원 Kim Chae-won,	〈겨울의 환幻〉 Annual Winter
1990 김원일 Kim Won-il,	〈마음의 감옥〉 Prison of the Heart
1991 조성기 Cho Sung-ki,	〈우리 시대의 소설가〉 The Novelist of Our Time
1992 양귀자 Yang Gui-ja,	〈숨은 꽃〉 The Hidden Flower
1993 최수철 Choi Suchol, 〈얼음의 도가니〉 The Ice Melting Pot
1994 최윤 Choe Yun, 〈하나코는 없다〉 The Last of Hanako
1995 윤후명 Yun Humyong,	〈하얀 배〉 White Boat
1996 윤대녕 Yun Dae-nyeong,	〈천지간〉 Between Heaven and Earth
1997 김지원 Kim Ji-won,	〈사랑의 예감〉 Premonition of Love
1998 은희경 Eun Hee-kyung,	〈아내의 상자〉 Wife’s Box
1999 박상우 Park Sang-woo,	〈내 마음의 옥탑방〉 The Rooftop Unit in my soul
2000 이인화 Lee In-hwa,	〈시인의 별〉 Poet’s Star
2001 신경숙 Shin Kyung-sook,	〈부석사〉 Buseoksa
2002 권지예 Kwan Ji-Hye,	〈뱀장어 스튜〉 Eel Stew
2003 김인숙 Kim In-sook,	〈바다와 나비〉 Ocean and Butterfly
2004 김훈 Kim Hoon,	〈화장〉 Cremation (Called "From Powder to Powder" in translation)
2005 한강 Han Kang, 〈몽고반점〉 Mongolian Mark (published in English as part of The Vegetarian) 
2006 정미경 Jung Mikyung,	〈밤이여, 나뉘어라〉 Night, Let Split
2007 전경린 Jon Kyong-nin, 〈천사는 여기 머문다〉 An Angel Lives Here
2008 권여선 Kwon Yeo-sun, 〈사랑을 믿다〉 Believe in Love
2009 김연수 Kim Yeon-su, 〈산책하는 이들의 다섯 가지 즐거움〉 Five Pleasures for Those Who Take Walks
2010 박민규 Park Min-gyu, 〈아침의 문〉 The Door of Morning
2011 공지영 Gong Ji-young, 〈맨발로 글목을 돌다〉 Wander the alleyways barefoot
2012 김영하 Kim Young-ha, 〈옥수수와 나〉
2013 김애란 Kim Ae-ran, 〈침묵의 미래〉The future of Slience
2014 편혜영 Pyun Hye-young, 〈몬순〉Monsoon
2015 김숨 Kim Soom,  〈뿌리 이야기〉Story of Root
2016 김경욱 Kim Kyung-uk, 〈천국의 문〉
2017 구효서 Gu Hyo-seo, 〈풍경소리〉
2018 손홍규, 〈꿈을 꾸었다고 말했다〉
2019 윤이형 Yun I-hyeong, 〈그들의 첫 번째와 두 번째 고양이〉
2021 이승우 Lee Seung-u, 〈마음의 부력〉

References

 
South Korean literary awards
Fiction awards
Awards established in 1977
Yi Sang